The 2023 4 Hours of Abu Dhabi was an endurance sportscar racing event held between 17 and 19 February 2023, as final rounds of 2023 Asian Le Mans Series season.

Schedule

Entry list 

The No. 65 Viper Niza Racing withdrew from this racing weekend after an accident during 4 Hours of Dubai Race 2. The No. 54 Dinamic GT and No. 61 TF Sport also withdrew from Abu Dhabi races.

Ollie Millroy and Benjamin Barker continued to drive for No. 72 HubAuto Racing and No. 74 Kessel Racing respectively after being substitutes in Dubai. Marvin Kirchhöfer raced for No. 88 Garage 59 after missing both Dubai races because of being ill. Ahmad Al Harthy joined 99 Racing as Bronze-rated driver. Nicolas Lapierre, the driver of No. 37 Cool Racing, decided to step down from driving duties this weekend to allow Malthe Jakobsen gain more track time.

Free practice 
 Only the fastest car in each class is shown.

Race 1

Qualifying 
Pole position winners in each class are marked in bold.

Race

Race result 
The minimum number of laps for classification (70% of overall winning car's distance) was 70 laps. Class winners are marked in  bold.

Statistics

Fastest lap

Race 2

Qualifying 
Pole position winners in each class are marked in bold.

Race

Race result 
The minimum number of laps for classification (70% of overall winning car's distance) was 91 laps. Class winners are marked in  bold.

Statistics

Fastest lap

References 

Abu Dhabi
Abu Dhabi